Abd al-Muttalib ibn Muhammad was the fourteenth Tayyibi Isma'ili Dāʿī al-Muṭlaq in Yemen, from 1345 to his death in 1354. He followed Ali Shams al-Din I, and was himself succeeded by Abbas ibn Muhammad.

Family
Syedna Abd al-Muttalib was the son of 12th Dai Muhammad ibn Hatim. His brother was the 15th Dai Abbas ibn Muhammad.

Life
Syedna Abd al-Muttalib entrusted his brother Syedna Abbas with promoting education. 

Shareef Ibrahim bin Abdullah, ruler of Sanaa sought to capture territories under the jurisdiction of Syedna Abd al-Muttalib but backed out. Henceforth relations remained cordial.

Death
He died on 24 Rajab, 755 AH (August 8, 1354 AD). The grave of the Dāʿī along with those of the 16th and 17th Dāʿīs are at the hilltop Zimarmar Fort. The small square is grave of their  maʾdhūn (senior deputy) Ahmad ibn Ali ibn Hanzala. On the hill top there still exist remains of a mosque, buildings and water reservoirs.

Gallery

References

Sources
 

Year of birth unknown
1354 deaths
Banu al-Walid al-Anf
Tayyibi da'is
14th century in Yemen
14th-century Arabs
14th-century Ismailis
14th-century Islamic religious leaders